Shri Mahendra Sahni (4 April 1940 in Brahmapura, Muzaffarpur district, Bihar – 6 November 2009) was an Indian politician of the Janata Dal (United) party who was a Member of the Parliament of India representing Bihar in the Rajya Sabha, the upper house of the Indian Parliament.

He was member of Bihar Legislative Council during 1994–2000.

References

External links
 Profile on Rajya Sabha website

Janata Dal (United) politicians
Rajya Sabha members from Bihar
2009 deaths
1940 births
Members of the Bihar Legislative Council